Thomas Tillinghast (August 21, 1742August 26, 1821) was a United States representative from Rhode Island. Born in East Greenwich in the Colony of Rhode Island and Providence Plantations, Tillinghast was elected as a member of the Rhode Island House of Representatives and served from 1772 to 1773. He held several offices under the Revolutionary authorities and again served in the Rhode Island House of Representatives from  1778 to 1780. He was a judge of the Court of Common Pleas in 1779. He was a member of the council of war. He served as an associate justice of the Rhode Island Supreme Court from May 1781 to May 1787, and again from May 1791 until his resignation in December 1797.

He was a great grandson of Rev. Pardon Tillinghast (1622–1718)

Tillinghast was elected as a Federalist to the Fifth Congress to fill the vacancy caused by the resignation of Francis Malbone and served from November 13, 1797, to March 3, 1799.  He was again elected as a Democratic-Republican to the Seventh Congress and served from March 4, 1801 to March 3, 1803.

Tillinghast died in East Greenwich, Rhode Island on August 26, 1821.  Interment was in Tillinghast Lot (Rhode Island Historical Cemetery East Greenwich #18) located on South County Road, East Greenwich.

References

1742 births
1821 deaths
People from Kent County, Rhode Island
Rhode Island Democratic-Republicans
Members of the Rhode Island House of Representatives
Justices of the Rhode Island Supreme Court
People from East Greenwich, Rhode Island
Federalist Party members of the United States House of Representatives from Rhode Island
Democratic-Republican Party members of the United States House of Representatives
People of colonial Rhode Island
Burials in Rhode Island